Fialuridine, or 1-(2-deoxy-2-fluoro-1-D-arabinofuranosyl)-5-iodouracil (FIAU), is a nucleoside analogue that was investigated as a potential therapy for hepatitis B virus infection. In a 1993 clinical study at the NIH, unexpected toxicity led to the death of 5 out of 15 patients from liver failure alongside lactic acidosis; two further participants required liver transplantation. It is suspected that the toxicity of fialuridine was a result of mitochondrial damage caused by the incorporation of fialuridine into mitochondrial DNA via its 3'-hydroxyl moiety, leading to impaired DNA synthesis. This toxicity was unusual in that it was not predicted by animal studies.

References 

Antiviral drugs
Nucleosides
Organofluorides
Organoiodides
withdrawn drugs
Tetrahydrofurans
Diols
Pyrimidinediones
Arabinosides
Clinical trial disasters
Hydroxymethyl compounds